Sivaraman may refer to:

Athippatta Sivaraman, better known as A. S. Nair, a painter, illustrator and cartoonist from Kerala, India
Sivaraman Cheriyanad (1941–2019), Malayalam-language writer from Kerala, India
Kottakkal Sivaraman (1936–2010), revolutionised the portrayal of female roles in classical dance-drama from Kerala in southern India
S. Sivaraman, Indian politician and former Member of the Legislative Assembly of Tamil Nadu
Umayalpuram K. Sivaraman (born 1935), Indian mridangam player

See also
Savaran (disambiguation)
Sivaram (disambiguation)